The Quiet Hour  is a 2014 British science fiction film written and directed by Stéphanie Joalland and produced by Sean Anthony McConville. It stars Dakota Blue Richards, Karl Davies, Jack McMullen, and Brigitte Millar.

Plot
Humans are few and far between since Earth was invaded by unseen extraterrestrial machines that harvest the planet's natural resources and relentlessly kill its inhabitants. In a remote part of the countryside, where starved humans have become as dangerous as the alien machines hovering in the sky, a feisty 25-year-old girl, Sarah Connolly, sets out on a desperate attempt to fight back a group of bandits and defend her parents' farm, their remaining livestock, and the solar panels  that keep them safe from extraterrestrials. If she doesn't succeed, she will lose her only source of food and shelter; but if she resists, she and her helpless blind sibling will be killed. And if the mysterious intruder dressed like a soldier who claims he can help them turns out to be a liar, then the enemy may already be in the house.

Cast
Dakota Blue Richards as Sarah
Karl Davies as Jude
Jack McMullen as Tom Connelly
Brigitte Millar as Kathryn
Zeb Moore as Brian

Production
The film was shot in County Tipperary in Ireland and made its world premiere in July 2014 at the 26th Galway Film Fleadh. It was nominated for Best UK Feature at the 22nd Raindance Film Festival, where it made its UK premiere on 3 October 2014.

The film was produced by Frenzy Films and distributed by Vision Films.

Reception
At Blueprint Review, Katy Vans wrote:There is a very English bleakness about the film’s atmosphere and the leads are quiet and non-hysterical, stoical; just how you might expect most of the UK to act were we to get invaded by aliens.
At Cryptic Rock, Samantha Andujar gave the film 4 out of 5 stars, writing:[While] the film is a great, original, and engaging approach to the Post-Apocalyptic film genre, it seems to focus more on character and dialogue than the actual story... The pace is overall very slow for the entire film, but the well-developed protagonist makes it a worth-watching experience... it will be exciting to see more from this exciting director.

References

External links
 

2014 films
British science fiction films
Irish science fiction films
English-language Irish films
2010s British films